Amanda Michael Plummer (born March 23, 1957) is an American actress. She is known for her work on stage and for her roles in such films as Joe Versus the Volcano (1990), The Fisher King (1991), Pulp Fiction (1994), and The Hunger Games: Catching Fire (2013). Plummer won a Tony Award in 1982 for her performance in Agnes of God. She currently plays Vadic in the third season of Star Trek: Picard (2023).

Early life 
Plummer was born on March 23, 1957, in New York City, the only child of American actress Tammy Grimes and Canadian actor Christopher Plummer. Her father said that they named their daughter Amanda Michael after Amanda Prynne, a character from the play Private Lives, and the actress Michael Learned. She attended the elite Trinity School before graduating from the United Nations International School (UNIS). She attended Middlebury College for two and a half years and, as a young adult, studied acting at the Neighborhood Playhouse School of the Theatre in New York City.

Career 
Plummer has received critical acclaim for her film work, including such films as Cattle Annie and Little Britches (1981), The World According to Garp (1982), Daniel (1983), and The Hotel New Hampshire (1984). Other films of note include The Fisher King, for which she received a BAFTA film nomination (1992), a Chicago Film Critics Association Award nomination (1992), and a Los Angeles Film Critics Association Award (1992).

Other films include Pulp Fiction, for which she received an American Comedy Award nomination; Girlfriend; Butterfly Kiss, My Life Without Me; Vampire, and Ken Park. She made her Broadway debut as Jo in the 1981 revival of A Taste of Honey, which ran for almost a year with Valerie French playing Helen, Jo's mother. She received a Tony Award nomination, a Theatre World, a Drama Desk, and an Outer Critics Circle Awards for her portrayal.

She won a Tony Award for Featured Actress and the Drama Desk, Outer Critics Circle and Boston Critics Circle Awards for her portrayal of Agnes in Agnes of God, with Geraldine Page and Elizabeth Ashley. In 1983, she portrayed Laura Wingfield in a Broadway revival of The Glass Menagerie. Other Broadway performances include Dolly Clandon in You Never Can Tell (1986), and as Eliza Doolittle in Pygmalion (1987; for which she received her third Tony Award nomination, this time for Best Performance by a Leading Actress in a Play.)

Off-Broadway plays include Beth in Sam Shepard's A Lie of the Mind, and Killer Joe, written by Tracy Letts. She has performed in many of Tennessee Williams' plays, including Summer and Smoke, The Gnädiges Fräulein, The Milk Train Doesn't Stop Here Anymore, and the world premiere of The One Exception.

In 1996, Plummer won an Emmy Award for her guest appearance on the episode "A Stitch in Time" of The Outer Limits. In 2005, she won an Emmy as Miranda Cole in the Law & Order: Special Victims Unit episode "Weak", in which she played a woman with schizophrenia.

She was nominated for a Golden Globe Award and received another Emmy Award for her performance in Miss Rose White, a Hallmark made-for-television film about a Holocaust survivor, for which she received the Anti-Defamation League Award. For her performance in Last Light (1993), she received a Cable Ace Award nomination. Other awards include the Hollywood Drama Critics Award for her performance in the title female role in Romeo and Juliet, the Saturn Award for her performance as Nettie in Needful Things (1993), and a Cable Ace Award for her performance in The Right To Remain Silent (1996).

Plummer played Wiress, a former "tribute" who won the Hunger Games, in The Hunger Games: Catching Fire (2013), the film adaptation of the second novel of The Hunger Games trilogy, by Suzanne Collins. Plummer starred alongside Brad Dourif in the critically acclaimed Off Broadway revival of Tennessee Williams' The Two-Character Play at New World Stages in 2013.

In 2020, Plummer was featured in the Netflix drama series Ratched. Plummer plays Vadic, the main villain of the third and final season of Star Trek: Picard, in 2023.

Personal life 
Plummer dated screenwriter and director Paul Chart in the late 1990s. The two lived together in Los Angeles and worked together on Chart's film American Perfekt.

Filmography

Film

Television

Stage

References

External links

 
 
 
 Article, playbill.com, October 20, 2004; accessed May 6, 2014.
 Profile, hollywood.com (archived); accessed May 6, 2014.
 New York Times article referencing Amanda Plummer, April 28, 1996; accessed May 6, 2014.
 Stephen Capen Interview on Worldguide, Futurist Radio Hour, October 14, 1995.
 
 New York Times Arts Blog on The Two-Character Play, June 2013; accessed May 5, 2014.
 The Two-Character Play Off-Broadway 2013

1957 births
Living people
20th-century American actresses
21st-century American actresses
Actresses from New York City
American film actresses
American people of Canadian descent
American people of English descent
American people of Scottish descent
American stage actresses
American television actresses
American voice actresses
Canadian film actresses
Canadian people of American descent
Canadian people of English descent
Canadian people of Scottish descent
Canadian stage actresses
Canadian voice actresses
Canadian television actresses
Drama Desk Award winners
Middlebury College alumni
Neighborhood Playhouse School of the Theatre alumni
Outstanding Performance by a Supporting Actress in a Miniseries or Movie Primetime Emmy Award winners
Tony Award winners